Ebenezer Forrest (fl. 1774), was an English attorney.

Forrest resided at George Street, York Buildings, London, and was intimate with William Hogarth and John Rich, proprietor of the Lincoln's Inn Theatre. He was the father of Theodosius Forrest.

Works
Forrest's opera Momus turn'd Fabulist, or Vulcan's Wedding, was performed at the Lincoln's Inn Theatre on 3 December 1729 and some subsequent nights. He also wrote An Account of what seemed most remarkable in the five days' peregrination of the five following persons, viz. Messrs. Tothall, Scott, Hogarth, Thornhill, and F. Begun on Saturday, 27 May 1732, and finished on the 31st of the same month, London, 1782 (illustrated with plates by Hogarth). It was reprinted with William Gostling's Hudibrastic version, London, 1872.

References

Year of birth missing
Year of death missing
18th-century classical composers
18th-century British male musicians
18th-century English people
English classical composers
English lawyers
English male classical composers
English opera composers
Male opera composers
English writers